Estudio Destra Internationally renowned Ceramics/Pottery Workshop based in Silves, Algarve, Portugal.

Specializes in handpainted murals on tiles.

Estudio Destra was founded in the 1980s by the artist Katherine Swift (1956–2004) and the ceramicist Roger Metcalfe. They had both previously worked in the famous Porches Pottery (Olaria Algarve), founded by Katherine's father, Patrick Swift.

It is located in a 16th-century Jewish townhouse in the historic town of Silves, Algarve. Silves was once the capital of the Algarve and an important Moorish city that rivalled Lisbon. Among the very few buildings to have survived the earthquake of 1775 in Silves were the Cathedral, begun in the 13th and completed in the 15th century, and the building that today houses Estudio Destra. During the building's restoration a small indentation was noticed on the doorpost where a mezuzah — the little case containing a handwritten scripture from Deuteronomy and a fixture on 
a Jewish home — once hung.

It has gone on to gain international repute and work from this studio is bought by collectors from around the world.

Estudio Destra Studio Tiles Website

External links and further reading 
Estudio Destra Studio Tiles Website 
Porches Pottery Website 
Estudio Destra contact 
Estudio Destra Images 
AA Portugal (Spiral), p. 17, tiles by Katherine Swift, 2009.
Patrick Swift 1927-83, Veronica Jane O’Mara (ed.), Gandon Editions, Kinsale, 1993.
Patrick Swift: An Irish Painter in Portugal, Gandon Editions, 2001.
AA Algarve Guide (AA Spiral Guides), p. 28-29; Swift family and ceramics.
Artnet 
Frommers, Algarve Travel 
Portugal, David J. J. Evans 
Richard Neubersch, Algarve Report, p. 57 
Algarve Inspirations 
Algarve Resident: Porches Pottery- The Inside Story 
Patrick Kavanagh: A Biography, Antoinette Quinn, Gill & MacMillan Ltd, 2001.
Algarve Resident, Anniversary Party 
Images 
Algarve, Top 10, Eyewitness Travel, p. 91, p. 79. 
Estudio Destra today, run by Roger Metcalfe 
Images 
Algarve Welcome Magazine 

Ceramics manufacturers of Portugal
Art pottery